The SECR L class was a class of 4-4-0 steam tender locomotive built for express passenger service on the South Eastern and Chatham Railway.  Although designed by Harry Wainwright, they were built during the Maunsell era.

Background
The South Eastern and Chatham Railway (SECR) was an amalgamation of two competing companies, the South Eastern Railway (SER) and the London, Chatham and Dover Railway (LCDR) which took place in 1899. One of the first tasks of Harry Wainwright, the new Chief Mechanical Engineer, was to introduce a series of standard locomotives which would operate on both railways; but the LCDR main line was more lightly engineered and subject to more severe weight restrictions than that of the SER. At the same time the Board of Directors was anxious to reap some of the financial benefits of amalgamation by closing the LCDR Longhedge Railway Works.

During the first years of the SECR, express passenger services were well served by Wainwright's 'D' and 'E' 4-4-0 classes; however loads continued to increase and by 1912 the designer realised that he would soon need more powerful locomotives. Unfortunately the weight restrictions on the LCDR main line prevented the use of any significantly larger or more powerful locomotives, and strengthening the bridges on this line would have been prohibitively expensive. The Board of Directors therefore ordered Wainwright to prepare a design for a locomotive class specifically for the SER main line services. Wainwright's original design was criticised by the Directors for the use of saturated steam and slide valves, both of which were considered old fashioned in the 20th century. These criticisms coincided with an acute motive power crisis on the railway during the summer of 1913, due in part to the Directors' insistence on the premature closure of Longhedge Works and the inability of Ashford railway works to cope with the increased workload. As a result Wainwright was asked to retire on 30 November 1913, before these new 'L class' locomotives could be ordered.

Design and construction
Wainwright's original design for the new class was for a handsome and robust locomotive which incorporated a Belpaire firebox. Later revisions incorporated piston valves and a Schmidt superheater. After Wainwright's departure his assistant, Robert Surtees, made further detailed changes – slightly enlarging the boiler, firebox and wheels – and substituting a Robinson design superheater, before placing an order for twelve examples with Beyer Peacock for delivery by the end of June 1914. After Richard Maunsell took office in January 1914, he agreed to the ordering of a further ten with minor detail differences and Schmidt superheaters from Borsig of Berlin.  The Borsig locomotives were delivered just in time before the outbreak of World War I. They were supplied in kit form and assembled at Ashford railway works by Borsig employees. The Beyer Peacock series were delayed and were delivered later, between August and November 1914.

L1 class

Following the grouping of the SECR with other railways to form the Southern Railway (UK) in 1923 Maunsell developed the design in 1926 with his L1 class. The design was enlarged and the weight increased to 57 tons 16 cwt. The boiler pressure was increased from 160 to 180 lbs per square inch but the cylinders reduced in diameter from 20.5 to 19.5 inches. The engines also had long-travel piston valves, Maunsell’s own design of superheater and side-window cab and other detail alterations. 
As a result of the success of these changes Maunsell later gradually increased the boiler pressure of  the ‘L class’ and fitted them with smaller cylinders and his own superheater over the next two decades as they passed through the workshops for other reasons.

Numbering
The Beyer Peacock locomotives were numbered were 760-771, and those from Borsig 772-781. All passed to the Southern Railway (SR) in 1923, and initially an "A" prefix was added to the SECR numbers; later the engines were renumbered 1760-1781.  All passed to British Railways (BR) in 1948 and BR numbered them 31760-31781.

Operational details
The locomotives were used on express trains on the South Eastern main lines from London to Dover, Ramsgate, and Hastings. They remained on these duties until the mid-1920s when they were gradually replaced on the heavier trains by the newer SR L1 class, and in the 1930s by the "King Arthur" and "Schools" classes. By this time improvements had been made to the LCDR main line to Dover and Ramsgate and so they continued to be used on these services until after the Second World War and the Nationalisation of British Railways in 1948. However, the transfer of Bulleid "Light Pacifics" to these services in the early 1950s made the class largely redundant. Some were transferred to Eastleigh and Brighton to replace worn out locomotives on cross-country services, but withdrawal began in 1956. The final locomotive was withdrawn in December 1961. None have been preserved.

Locomotive summary

Sources

External links

 SECR L Class Southern E-Group
 Class details (L Class) RailUK
 Class details (L1 Class) RailUK

L
4-4-0 locomotives
Beyer, Peacock locomotives
Borsig locomotives
Railway locomotives introduced in 1914
Scrapped locomotives
Standard gauge steam locomotives of Great Britain
Passenger locomotives